Jack Harman  (1927–2001) was a Canadian sculptor from Vancouver, British Columbia, the "creator of some of Canada's best-known public art," including an equestrian monument of Queen Elizabeth II  on Parliament Hill, unveiled by the Queen in 1992. He studied at the Vancouver School of Art and Slade School of Art and Hammersmith School of Art in England. He would later teach at the VSA as well as at the UBC Extension School.

His public sculptures in Vancouver include Statue of Harry Jerome, The Family (formerly at Pacific Press Building, now in Surrey, British Columbia), at the Pacific National Exhibition and at the Vancouver Law Courts. His work is also elsewhere in Canada, including Parliament Hill and the British Columbia Legislature. His work is also held by the Government of Ontario Art Collection, the University of British Columbia and the City of Nanaimo. He also contributed to the Peacekeeping Monument in Ottawa.

He received the Order of British Columbia in 1996, cited for creating "some of Vancouver’s best known sculpture."

References

Further reading 
 Archives.gov
 Vancouver Sun

1927 births
2001 deaths
Artists from Vancouver
Canadian sculptors
Canadian male sculptors
Alumni of the Slade School of Fine Art